Shastri Nagar is a residential area in Goregaon, Mumbai, India. Like most localities in the western suburbs, it has several international schools like VIBGYOR High School, Temples (Ram Mandir), a Mosque, Rosary Church, Gurudwara and a Buddh Vihar. There is also a small Jain Temple.

Shastri Nagar is connected by roads such as Link road, M.G. Road, and S.V. Road.
The M G Road connects the Goregaon Railway Station with Shastri Nagar.
The current Sitting MLA is Subhash Desai of Shiv Sena and the BMC Corporator is Sameer Desai.

Shastri Nagar has more than thirty co-op housing societies. Most societies in this area are over 30 years old, hence most of them are under reconstruction. Among the newer, more posh buildings is Shepherd, Shraddha, and Fourteen Stars Society, etc. The housing societies in Shastri Nagar Nagar are from 1 to 10 types.

Travel
 Shastri Nagar is not very far from Goregaon Station.
 Buses from Goregaon Station to Shastri Nagar - 262, 261, 204, 270, etc.
 Shastri Nagar has upcoming Metro Station in the third phase of Mumbai Metro. 
 Goregaon Bus Depot is next to Shastri Nagar.

Shopping
Inorbit Mall, HyperCity, Mega Mall and the Mindspace Office Complex (home to nearly 25 multinational corporations in Business Process Outsourcing and Knowledge Process Outsourcing) are close to Shastri Nagar.

References

External links
1. Wikimapia - Wikimapia

Neighbourhoods in Mumbai
Memorials to Lal Bahadur Shastri